The Santa Teresa Mountains are a mountain range located within the Coronado National Forest and partly within the San Carlos Apache Indian Reservation, in western Graham County, Arizona. Hiking or recreational activity in the San Carlos Indian Reservation section of the mountain range may require special permission and/or a permit at the cost of a small fee.

The Santa Teresa Wilderness area is in the range. It is attached north with the North Santa Teresa Wilderness.

Black Rock
Black Rock is an important landmark, in the eastern region of the range. It is important in the heritage of Native Americans.

References

External links

 Santa Teresa Wilderness USFS
 North Santa Teresa Wilderness BLM
 Trails: (trails.com) – Cobre Grande Peak/Mountain, 6767ft, (coordinates 32.9670, 110.2929)
 Summitpost

Mountain ranges of Graham County, Arizona
Madrean Sky Islands mountain ranges
Arizona transition zone mountain ranges
Mountain ranges of Arizona